Saurocephalus (from  , 'lizard' and   'head') is an extinct genus of ray-finned fishes within the family Saurodontidae. The genus was first described in 1824 and contains six or seven species, including the type species S. lanciformis. Saurocephalus first appeared during the early Valanginian and continued on to the Maastrichtian, when it went extinct.

Saurocephalus is almost entirely represented by fragmentary specimens with the exception of a few complete specimens, such as a near-complete specimen of the species S. longicorpus from Jordan. The complete material from Jordan offered an extensive amount of valuable information about Saurocephalus. With an elongate, torpedo-like body, Saurocephalus was extremely fast and it was probably a formidable open water ambush predator. The morphology of its teeth and jaw structure suggest it was a piscivore. The closely set very sharp and firmly anchored teeth lined up along the upper and lower jaws acted together like sharp serrated scissors. The ventral extension of the upper jaw deep unto the sides of the lower jaw made the jaws perform like meat slicers. Saurocephalus was a powerful and ferocious predator with a powerful jaw capable of slicing and biting off large chunks of meat from its potential prey items - no doubt, fish was on top of the diet list. To process large prey, it would cut them into smaller more manageable pieces using its large jaws and serrated teeth. A close modern analogue of Saurocephalus and to the matter saurodontids, would be barracudas (Sphyraena barracuda), known to ambush, ram, and stun their prey using the strong anterior projection of the dentary. Although not as notably elongate, the overall body outline of barracudas is similar to Saurocephalus.

References

Ichthyodectiformes
Cretaceous fish of North America
Fossil taxa described in 1824